The 30th South American Junior Championships in Athletics were held in Córdoba, Argentina from May 16–17, 1998.

Participation (unofficial)
Detailed result lists can be found on the "World Junior Athletics History" website.  An unofficial count yields the number of about 286 athletes from about 11 countries:  Argentina (66), Bolivia (12), Brazil (68), Chile (46), Colombia (24), Ecuador (15), Panama (3), Paraguay (4), Peru (9), Uruguay (15), Venezuela (24).

Medal summary
Medal winners are published for men and women
Complete results can be found on the "World Junior Athletics History" website.

Men

Women

Medal table (unofficial)

References

External links
World Junior Athletics History

South American U20 Championships in Athletics
South American
South American
International athletics competitions hosted by Argentina
1998 in South American sport
1998 in youth sport